The events of 1984 in anime.

Events
June 22 - APPP is created

Accolades 
Ōfuji Noburō Award: Nausicaä of the Valley of the Wind

Releases

See also
1984 in animation

References

External links 
Japanese animated works of the year, listed in the IMDb

Anime
Anime
Years in anime